The 2004 Dally M Awards were presented on Tuesday 7 September 2004 at the Sydney Town Hall in Sydney and broadcast on Fox Sports. Warren Smith presided as Master of Ceremonies.

Dally M Player of the Year
Dally M Player of the Year:  Danny Buderus

Dally M Awards
The Dally M Awards were, as usual, conducted at the close of the regular season and hence do not take games played in the finals series into account. The Dally M Medal is for the official player of the year while the Provan-Summons Medal is for the fans' of "people's choice" player of the year.

Team of the Year

Sources:

Hall of Fame Inductees
Pre-WWII
 Frank Burge (Glebe, St George; lock/second-row from 1911–27)
 Harold Horder (Souths, Norths; winger from 1912–1924)
 Vic Hey (Wests, Ipswich, Leeds, Dewsbury, Hunslet, Parramatta; five-eighth from 1933–49)

Post-WWII
 Harry Bath (Balmain, Barrow, Warrington, St George; second row from 1946–59)
 Norm Provan (St George; second row from 1951–1965)
 Ken Irvine (Norths, Manly; winger from 1958–1973)

See also
Dally M Awards
Dally M Medal
2004 NRL season

References

2004 sports awards
2004 NRL season
2004